Dr. Rudolf Zistler or Cistler (1886–1960) was an Austro-Hungarian socialist and lawyer, most known for having defended members of Young Bosnia on trial for the assassination of Archduke Franz Ferdinand of Austria.

Zistler moved to Sarajevo after the end of World War I. His daughter Vanda Zistler became a prominent opera singer at the Sarajevo Opera, and had a "clear, powerful voice".

In 1937, Rudolf Zistler published a book about his experiences, titled  (How I came to defend Princip and the others).

A movie has been made about him: The Man Who Defended Gavrilo Princip (2014).

References

1886 births
1960 deaths
20th-century Austrian lawyers
Assassination of Archduke Franz Ferdinand of Austria
Lawyers from Zagreb
Young Bosnia
Yugoslav socialists